Brian Saunders (date of birth and death unknown) was a male weightlifter who competed for England.

Weightlifting career
Saunders was the last person to be both the British Amateur Weight Lifters' Association (BAWLA) weightlifting champion and BAWLA powerlifting champion; the latter of which he won in 1970 and 1974.

He represented England in the super heavyweight category of +110 kg Combined, at the 1970 British Commonwealth Games in Edinburgh, Scotland.

References

Date of birth missing
Date of death missing
English male weightlifters
Weightlifters at the 1970 British Commonwealth Games
Commonwealth Games competitors for England